Audrey Horne are a hard rock  band from Bergen, Norway. The band took its name from Sherilyn Fenn's character in the cult TV series Twin Peaks. Although some of the band's members play or have previously played in black metal bands like Enslaved and Gorgoroth, Audrey Horne's music is far removed from the black metal genre, and can be described as heavy and melodic classic rock, similar to bands like Van Halen, Kiss, Deep Purple, Thin Lizzy, Ozzy Osbourne, Iron Maiden, Faith No More and Alice In Chains.

History
The band was formed in 2002 by Toschie (formerly in Sylvia Wane), Thomas Tofthagen (Sahg), Arve Isdal aka Ice Dale (Enslaved, Bourbon Flame ao), Kjetil Greve (Deride), Tom Cato Visnes aka King ov Hell (Gorgoroth, God Seed, Sahg, King Ov Hell) and Herbrand Larsen (Enslaved).

Although some (most) of the members were known from more extreme, progressive or black metal bands, Audrey Horne was to become a more melodic hard  classic rock band

The debut album. No Hay Banda 
Leading up to the band's first album they released the 4-track EP Confessions & Alcohol. The title song from the EP was the single from the upcoming album while the rest of the songs are only found on this EP. The song "Halo" later resurfaced as a live song on some Audrey Horne concerts in 2009.

The band's debut album No Hay Banda was released in April 2005.
Recorded at Earshot Studio in Bergen (Norway) it was an Audrey Horne/Joe Barresi co-production and mixed by Joe Barresi at Bay7 Studios in Los Angeles (USA).

The album received generally good reviews and also won them a Norwegian Grammy Award in the Best Metal Act category in 2006. Due to unfortunate circumstances concerning management and booking they didn't get as many gigs as they wanted, although the reception from the audience was very good. They mostly toured the club scene in Norway and played at the 2005 Quart Festival as a warmup act for Audioslave.

Le Fol, and changes in the lineup
In 2007 Herbrand Larsen (keyboards) and Tom Cato Visnes left the band. Tom Cato to put more effort into Gorgoroth and Sahg, Herbrand Larsen because he needed more time at his job as a primary school teacher and playing with Enslaved. 
Herbrand has continued to work with the band in the studio both as a keyboard player and producer/engineer.

In August 2007 Audrey Horne released their second album Le Fol on Indie Recordings, produced by Ice Dale (Arve Isdal) mixed/co-produced by Herbrand Larsen. 
Once again recorded at Earshot Studio in Bergen. The band wanted to work with Joe Barresi for this album too but his busy schedule would have postponed the record by at least six months so the band decided to go ahead on their own.

Produced by Ice Dale and co-produced and mixed by Herbrand Larsen, who also played all keyboards on the album, it became an all in-house production. 
Le Fol received good reviews in both Norwegian and international press and earned Audrey Horne their second Norwegian Grammy Award nomination in the Best Metal Act category in 2008.

This time management and booking was in order and the band progressed from playing mainly club gigs in Norway to playing clubs and festivals in Norway and Europe and at the end of 2008 they went on a European Tour with Enslaved and  playing no less than 40 gigs in a month and a half starting November 6 in Copenhagen (Denmark) and ending in Bergen (Norway) on December 20. The tour visited Denmark, Germany, Belgium, UK, Netherlands, France, Spain, Italy, Austria, Slovenia, Switzerland, Czech Rep., Poland, Lithuania, Latvia, Estonia, Finland and Sweden before the final gigs in Norway.
The grueling schedule took its toll on Toschie's voice to the point where he could hardly sing at the end and caused him to stop smoking. He has not started again since.

Present and future events

In September 2009 the band once again teamed up with Joe Barresi at his JHOC studio (Joe's House of Compression) in Los Angeles to record their third album to be titled Audrey Horne, again on Indie Recordings. Release is set for late February/early March 2010. Joe Barresi is the producer/mixer/engineer on the album.

Drums, guitars and vocals were recorded at JHOC before the band returned to Bergen and Earshot & Conclave Studio (Earshot Studio moved to new locations and expanded, hence the name change), to record bass, keyboards and additional vocal and guitar tracks. All was sent to Joe Barresi and mixed at JHOC.
Espen Lien (Barbie Bones, Slut Machine, Trinacria) plays bass and Herbrand Larsen and Eyolf Nysæther plays keyboards.

On February 28, 2020 the band released their first live album Waiting for the Night, for which two concerts in Bergen from 2018 were recorded.
In March a tour with Formosa and Magick Touch followed, which was canceled due to the COVID-19 pandemic after the fifth concert in Germany.

Band members

Current members
Torkjell Rød/Toschie (vocal)
Arve Isdal/Ice Dale (guitar) (also in Enslaved)
Thomas Tofthagen (guitar)
Kjetil Greve (drums) (also in Deride)
Espen Lien (Bass)

Former members
King ov Hell (bass) (2002–2007) (God Seed, ex-Gorgoroth)
Herbrand Larsen (keyboards) (2002–2007)

Live Personnel
Eyolf Nysæther: Keyboards, backing vocals (2007–2009)
Marius Fimland: Bass, occasional backing vocals (2007–2009)
Espen Lien: Bass (2009-)
Kim Gulbrandsen: Keyboards, backing vocals (2010-)

Discography

Studio albums

EPs and singles
Confessions & Alcohol (EP) (2005)

References

External links

Audrey Horne official site
Audrey Horne official Myspace Page
Classic Rock: Introducing Audrey Horne

Norwegian hard rock musical groups
Norwegian rock music groups
Grammy Award winners
Spellemannprisen winners
Musical groups established in 2002
2002 establishments in Norway
Musical groups from Bergen